The 2020–21 Big West Conference men's basketball season began with practices in October 2020, followed by the start of the 2020–21 NCAA Division I men's basketball season in November. Conference play began in January 2021 and concluded in March 2021. Games against UC San Diego were counted as non-conference games as their results were not counted in the league standings during their transition period.

Preseason Awards
Preseason awards were announced by the league office on November 11, 2020.

Preseason men's basketball media poll
(First place votes in parenthesis)
 UC Irvine (28) 270
 UC Santa Barbara (9) 254
 UC Davis (1) 182
 Hawaii 165
 UC Riverside 160
 Long Beach State 141
 CSU Bakersfield 117
 CSU Northridge 102
 Cal State Fullerton 95
 Cal Poly 54

Conference matrix

All-Big West awards

Big West men's basketball weekly awards

References 

2020–21 Big West Conference men's basketball season